Villanueva Félix Cosse Vega (born 9 November 1933) is a Uruguayan actor, theater director, and writer who has developed a distinguished career in his country and internationally, especially in Argentina, where he has lived since 1973.

Biography
Villanueva Cosse is the father of Carolina Cosse, the head of the Ministry of Industry, Energy, and Mining from 2015 to 2019 and Intendant of Montevideo from 2020.

Since 1956 he has performed in more than 60 plays in Uruguay and Argentina, taken part in 20 feature films, and in numerous television series and specials.

He adapted Servant of Two Masters (Goldoni), Lysistrata (Aristophanes), and The Government Inspector (Gogol).

Cosse participated, as author and director, in international tours and festivals in Buenos Aires, Zurich, Caracas, Montevideo, New York, Mexico City, San Juan, Milan, and Stockholm, making presentations for El Galpón, Théatre Ecole, Open Theater, Cervantes National Theater, San Martín Theater, and People's Theater, among others.

In Argentina he worked as an actor and director – in 1975, in Querido Mentiroso as George Bernard Shaw, antagonist of China Zorrilla in the role of Mrs Patrick Campbell, and then directing Servant of Two Masters, produced by the actress.

Filmography
 Proceso a la infamia (1978)  ... Rafael Barca
  (1979)
  (1982) ... Miguel
 Espérame mucho (1983)
 En retirada (1984)  ... Funcionario
 Asesinato en el Senado de la Nación (1984) ... Don Alberto
 A King and His Movie (1986) ... Desfontaine
 The Loves of Kafka (1988)
 País cerrado, teatro abierto (1990) ... Él mismo
  (1991)
 ¿Dónde estás, amor de mi vida, que no te puedo encontrar? (1992)
 El caso María Soledad (1993) ... El Obispo
 ¿Le molestaría si le hago una pregunta? (1994, short film)
 Plaza de Almas (1997)
  (1998)...Degollador
 Foolish Heart (1998)
  (1999) ... Dr. Delfini
  (1999) ... Don Gerardo
 El lugar donde estuvo el paraíso (2001)

Television
 Black Octopus (1985)
 Verano del '98 (1998)
 Los Simuladores (2002)
 Epitafios (2004)
 Mujeres Asesinas (2006, episode "")

Theatrical productions
 Marat/Sade (adaptation, director)
 Príncipe azul (actor)
 Déjala sangrar (actor)
 Segovia (or De la poesía) (actor, director)
 Lisandro (translation, costumer)
 La Feria del miedo, el amor y la guerra (author)
 Copias (actor)
 Toque de queda (actor)
 Te llevo en la sangre (director)
 The Inspector (director)
 Mein Kampf, farsa (performer)
 Bohemian Lights (director)
 Cocinando con Elisa (director)
 Compañero del alma (author, actor, director)
 ¡Arriba, corazón! (performer)
 Feria del miedo, del amor y de la guerra (author, director)
 Cuatro caballetes (performer)
 Blues de la calle Balcarce (director)
 Acto cultural (actor)
 Espectros (actor)

Awards
Theater
Uruguay
 1969:  for Best Director for Servant of Two Masters 1970: Florencio Award for Best Supporting Actor for King Lear 1972: Florencio Award for Best Actor for Arturo Ui 2017: Declared an Illustrious Citizen of Montevideo Department

Argentina
 1973: Talía for Best Foreign Actor for Arturo Ui 1974/75: Estrella de mar for Best Director for Servant of Two Masters 1985/86: Estrella de mar for Best Lead Actor for Príncipe Azul 1985/86: José María Vilches for Best Lead Actor for Príncipe Azul 1988: María Guerrero for Best Director for Compañero del alma 1987/88: García Lorca Biennial Theatrical Event for Compañero del alma 1991/92: Municipal Award of the City of Buenos Aires for Best Independent Theatrical Production  1997/98: Leónidas Barletta for Best Independent Theatrical Production Cocinando con Elisa 1998: Trinidad Guevara nominee for Best Director for Cocinando con Elisa 1999: ACE Award nominee for Best Director for Bohemian Lights 2000: ACE Award nominee for Best Supporting Actor for Mein Kampf 2001: ACE Award for Best Director for The Inspector 2009: ACE Award for Best Director for Marat/SadeFilm
 1985: Junior Award for Best National Supporting Actor for Asesinato en el Senado de la Nación 1987: Silver Condor Award from the Argentine Association of Cinema Critics, Best Supporting Actor for A King and His MovieLibrettist
 1992: First Mention of the Tres Países (Argentina, Chile, Uruguay) Dramatic Competition for Compañero del alma''

References

External links
 

1933 births
20th-century Uruguayan male actors
21st-century Uruguayan male actors
Living people
People from Melo, Uruguay
Uruguayan dramatists and playwrights
Uruguayan expatriate actors in Argentina
Uruguayan male film actors
Uruguayan male stage actors
Uruguayan male television actors
Uruguayan people of Italian descent
Uruguayan theatre directors